A New Place in the Sun is the ninth album by American singer-guitarist Glen Campbell, released in 1968 by Capitol Records.

Track listing
Side 1
 "Freeborn Man" (Keith Allison, Mark Lindsay) – 2:40
 "The Last Letter" (Rex Griffin) – 2:55
 "She Called Me Baby" (Harlan Howard) – 3:00
 "Visions of Sugar Plums" (Glen Campbell, Jerry Fuller) – 1:53
 "I Have No One to Love Me Anymore" (Glen Campbell) - 2:43
 "The Legend of Bonnie and Clyde" (Merle Haggard) – 2:05

Side 2
 "A Place in the Sun" (Bryan Wells, Ron Miller) – 2:42
 "Have I Stayed Away Too Long?" (Frank Loesser) – 2:17
 "Within My Memory" (Mac Davis, Freddy Weller) – 2:11
 "The Twelfth of Never" (Jay Livingston, Paul Francis Webster) – 2:25
 "Sunny Day Girl" (Jeff Hildt, Roger Williams) – 2:11

Personnel
Music
 Glen Campbell – vocals, acoustic guitar
 John Hartford – banjo
 Al Casey – acoustic guitar
 Joe Osborn – bass guitar
 Bob Felts – drums
 Jim Gordon – drums

Production
 Producer - Al De Lory
 Arranged and conducted by Al De Lory

Charts
Album – Billboard (United States)

References

Glen Campbell albums
1968 albums
Capitol Records albums
Folk albums by American artists
Albums recorded at Capitol Studios